Xerolycosa is a small genus of wolf spiders in the family Lycosidae, subfamily Evippinae, consisting of three species which have a Palearctic distribution and one with an Afro-tropical distribution.

Species
, the World Spider Catalog accepted the following species:
Xerolycosa miniata (C.L. Koch, 1834) – Palearctic
Xerolycosa mongolica (Schenkel, 1963) – Russia, China
Xerolycosa nemoralis (Westring, 1861) – Palearctic
Xerolycosa sansibarina  Roewer, 1960 – Zanzibar

References

Araneomorphae genera
Lycosidae
Palearctic spiders
Taxa named by Friedrich Dahl